State Road 421 (NM 421) is a  state highway in the U.S. state of New Mexico maintained by the New Mexico Department of Transportation (NMDOT). The road, located in southeastern Union County, begins at  NM 402 between Amistad and Clayton and passes eastward through the town of Sedan to the Texas state line where the roadway continues as Texas State Highway 102 (SH 102) to U.S. Route 87 (US 87) near Dalhart, Texas. Before 1988, the road was part of a much longer NM 102.

Route description 
The  two-lane road begins at a t-intersection with NM 402 south of Clayton and west of Sedan in rural Union County. The highway passes through farmland as it travels east before it enters the small town of Sedan, serving as the town's main east-west road. After leaving Sedan, the highway traverses more farmland before terminating at the New Mexico–Texas state line just west of Farm to Market Road 296 (FM 296). The highway continues east into Dallam County, Texas as Texas State Highway 102 (SH 102) until it terminates at US 87 northwest of Dalhart.

History
NM 421 was originally designated as NM 102 between the current NM 402, then part of a northern extension of  NM 18, and Sedan in the 1940s. In the following decade, the road was extended southward along NM 18 then westward through Bueyeros and eastward to the state line meeting up with Texas's FM 808 which was then re-signed continuously as SH 102 in 1955. Both NM 421 and NM 402 received their current designations during the 1988 renumbering of the New Mexico highway system.

Major intersections

See also

References

External links

421
Transportation in Union County, New Mexico